Szkoła Rycerska or Akademia Szlachecka Korpusu Kadetów Jego Królewskiej Mości i Rzeczypospolitej (English: Nobles' Academy of the Corps of Cadets of His Royal Majesty and the Commonwealth) was the first state school in the Polish–Lithuanian Commonwealth.

18th century

The state Corps of Cadets was established in Warsaw on 15 March 1765 by King Stanisław August Poniatowski.

The Corps of Cadets was housed in the Kazimierz Palace (Pałac Kazimierzowski, now the rectorate of Warsaw University). The Corps' commandant was Prince Adam Kazimierz Czartoryski.

The Corps of Cadets was closed in 1795 following the suppression of the Kościuszko Uprising, which had been led by one of the Corps' first alumni, Tadeusz Kościuszko.

In the reign of Stanisław August Poniatowski, several private corps of cadets were also established: by A. Tyzenhauz at Grodno, K. Radziwiłł at Nieśwież, W. Potocki at Niemirów, A. Sułkowski at Rydzyna.

Interbellum

In the period between the two World Wars, the institution of the Corps of Cadets would be revived in Poland. Three state secondary schools of that name would be created: at Kraków (later at Lwów), at Modlin (later at Chełmno) and at Rawicz.

After World War II
After World War II, in the People's Republic of Poland, until 1956, there existed in Warsaw a Corps of Cadets of the Internal Security Corps (Korpus Bezpieczeństwa Wewnętrznego).

Revival
The original Corps' work is continued by Fundacja Szkoła Rycerska.

Notable alumni

 Tadeusz Kościuszko
Romualdas Giedraitis
 Jakub Jasiński
 Hans Moritz Hauke
 Julian Ursyn Niemcewicz
 Karol Kniaziewicz
 Kazimierz Nestor Sapieha
 Józef Sowiński
 Rajmund Rembieliński

See also
 Academy of National Defence
 Cadet Corps
 Cadet Corps (disambiguation)

Notes

References
"Korpusy kadetów" ("Corps of cadets"), Encyklopedia Powszechna PWN (PWN Universal Encyclopedia), volume 2, Warsaw, Państwowe Wydawnictwo Naukowe, 1974, p. 566.

Defunct schools in Poland
1795 disestablishments
Educational institutions established in 1765
Military history of Warsaw
Universities and colleges in the Polish–Lithuanian Commonwealth
Educational institutions disestablished in the 1790s